A tenant management organisations (TMO) is an organisation set up under the UK Government's Housing (Right to Manage) Regulations 1994, which allow residents of council housing or housing association homes in the UK to take over responsibility for the running of their homes.

Structure & operation
A TMO is created when residents (tenants and leaseholders) in a defined area of council or housing association homes create a corporate body and, typically, elect a management committee to run the body. This body then enters into a formal legal contract between the landlord of the home(s) and the council, known as the management agreement. This agreement outlines the services a TMO is responsible for and what services the council is responsible for. The services provided by TMOs are mainly funded by the management fees paid by the Council under the agreement.

The management agreement details precisely which services are managed by the TMO on behalf of the landlord. The extent of the devolution in service can vary enormously, particularly between small and large TMOs, but may typically include day-to-day repairs, allocations and lettings, tenancy management, cleaning and care taking and rent collection/recovery.

The TMO can take a number of legal forms. Registered TMOs may be a co-operative, or set up under corporate law.

Some 'guide TMOs' provide support to community groups interested in the concept (Friday Hill TMO and Millbank Estate TMO are two examples in London). The work of a TMO may touch and overlap with that of an arms-length management organisation (ALMO).

Setting up a TMO 
The London Borough of Hackney council website states the following as a possible plan to set up a TMO:

 Explore the options for involvement
 Right to manage notice
 Develop business plan training and negotiations
 Competence assessment
 Offer to tenants and then ballot
 Setting up and going live

If a TMO is set up, you will still remain as a tenant or a leaseholder of the council and your existing rights are protected.

Examples of tenant management organisations in England
Watmos Community Homes
Holland Rise & Whitebeam TMO
Kensington and Chelsea TMO
Leathermarket JMB
Bloomsbury EMB
Millbank Estate
Pendleton Together

References

External links
National Federation of Tenant Management Organisations 
UK Government guidance on the Right to Manage - 2012 MMA 
Confederation of Co-operative Housing (CCH)
1994 Modular Management Agreement (superseded by 2005 MMA) 
1994 MMA Calculating Allowances (superseded by 2005 MMA) 
2005 Modular Management Agreement (superseded by 2012 MMA) 

Public housing in the United Kingdom